The Speedway Control Bureau (SCB), known as the Speedway Control Board between 1948 and 2002, governs the sport of motorcycle speedway in the United Kingdom on behalf of the Auto Cycle Union (ACU). The directors are appointed by the ACU and British Speedway Promoters' Limited (BSPL). The SCB has the sole authority to initiate and enforce regulations; however, it usually acts on the recommendation of the BSPL.

See also
Elite League
Premier League
National League
British League
British League Division Two
Conference League
British Speedway Championship
Speedway in the United Kingdom

References

External links

Speedway in the United Kingdom
Sports governing bodies in the United Kingdom
Motorcycle racing organizations